Fuxian Lake stretches out through Chengjiang, Jiangchuan and Huaning Counties in Yunnan Province, spanning an area of 212 square kilometers. The lake is ranked third-largest in Yunnan, after Dian Lake and Erhai Lake. Also the deepest lake in Yunnan, it is 155 meters deep at its greatest depth. It is also the third-deepest fresh water lake in China, after Tianchi and Kanas Lake.

Climate
Fuxian Lake has humid subtropical climate (Köppen climate classification Cwa) with humid summers and mild dry winters.

Flora and fauna
Fuxian Lake is known for its unique fauna, including many endemic species. However, its relative isolation makes it vulnerable to biological invasions and pollution.

Together with other Yunnan lakes (Dian, Qilu, Yangzong, Xingyun, and Yilong), Fuxian is recognized as an ecoregion. Fuxian is one of three major Yunnan lakes with a high number of endemics, the others being Dian (Dianchi) and Erhai. There are 24 native fish species and subspecies in Fuxian Lake, including 11 endemics. The situation for most of these is precarious because they have been negatively impacted by the many introduction of exotic species of fish (26 species), habitat degradation, water pollution, and overfishing. The endemic fish are all cyprinids or stone loaches.

The fungus Dyrithiopsis lakefuxianensis, growing on submerged wood, has been collected from Fuxian Lake and described as a newly discovered species, as indicated by its scientific name.

A few native hydrophytes have disappeared from the lake.

The prehistoric Fuxianhuia from the early-Cambrian, significant in discussions of early arthropod evolution, is also named after the lake, where it was discovered in 1987.

Lost city
In 2001 People's Daily reported that earthenware and stonework covering an area of approximately 2.4–2.7 square kilometers had been discovered beneath the lake.  Carbon dating circa 2007 confirmed an age of 1,750 years. Yunnan Museum archaeologist Zhang Zengqi says the lake is the site of a city called Yunyuan that slid into the lake during an earthquake, according to Han era documents.

In 2006, CCTV made an additional survey. Carbon dating in 2007 found shells attached to relics to be roughly 1,750 years old. In October 2014 additional research was made on the site by a multidisciplinary team. Portions were mapped and 42 handmade stone artifacts were recovered from a depth of seven meters.

Notable sites
There are two major sites west of the lake: a military base at Lijiashan (speculated to be used for submarine testing and other forms of nautical engineering) and a nearby tourism resort.

The 1 m solar telescope of Yunnan Observatory is also built on a shore of the lake.

Panorama

References

National parks of China
Lakes of Yunnan
Geography of Yuxi